Al-Faw District is a district of the Basra Governorate in Iraq, bordering the Persian Gulf and the country of Kuwait. No oil fields are in the Faw district but the Iraq strategic pipeline runs through the area.

Districts of Basra Province